Polycrates (c.440-370 B.C.) was a sophist of Athens, who later retired to Cyprus.

Works
He wrote a work variously titled (here given as), The Indictment of Socrates, thought written sometime during the 390's B.C.  and also works, according to one source lauding, to another condemning,  the individual Clytaemnestra, who was known to have murdered her husband, and Busiris who killed and ate his guests. In addition to this verses on cooking pots, mice, counters, pebbles and salt.

The poet Aeschrion of Samos also claimed that Polycrates was the author of the sex manual traditionally attributed to Philaenis of Samos.

References

4th-century BC writers
4th-century BC Greek people
Ancient Athenians